This is a list of Barrage Balloon Organisations of the Royal Auxiliary Air Force formed shortly before and during the Second World War. As the AAF was ' embodied' with the RAF on the outbreak of war when the AAF stopped recruiting, all balloon squadron numbered 900 to 947 were AAF and from 948 to 999 were RAF.

Barrage Balloon Groups and Centres
data from:-

No. 30 (Balloon Barrage) Group AAF
17 Mar 1937 - 7 Jan 1945
No. 1 Balloon Centre
Kidbrooke, London SE3
4 Oct 1937 -  1960
No. 2 Balloon Centre
Hook, Surrey
1937 - pre Jun 1944
No. 3 Balloon Centre
Stanmore, Middlesex
1937 - Current
No. 4 Balloon Centre
Chigwell, Essex
2 Aug 1938 - 1 Apr 1943
No. 22 Balloon Centre
Biggin Hill, Kent
19 Feb 1944 - 20 Nov 1944
No. 23 Balloon Centre
Gravesend, Kent
1 Feb 1944 - 15 Jan 1945
No. 24 Balloon Centre
Redhill, Surrey
1 Jul 1944 - 15 Jan 1945
No. 31 (Balloon Barrage) Group AAF
Birmingham
1 Apr 1939 - 13 Nov 1941
No. 5 Balloon Centre
Whitehouse Common, Sutton Coldfield, Birmingham
Unknown - pre Jun 1944
No. 6 Balloon Centre
Wythall, Birmingham
Transferred to No 32 Group13 Nov 1941
No. 7 Balloon Centre
Curzon Lane, Alvaston, Derbyshire
Unknown - pre Jun 1944
No. 8 Balloon Centre
Fazakerley, Liverpool
Unknown - pre Jun 1944
No. 9 Balloon Centre
Houghton Green, Warrington
Unknown - pre Jun 1944
No. 10 Balloon Centre
Bowlee, Middleton, Greater Manchester
Unknown - pre Jun 1944

No. 32 (Balloon Barrage) Group AAF
Romsey / Bath
1 Mar 1939 - 15 Nov 1944
No. 11 Balloon Centre
Pucklechurch, Bristol
No. 12 Balloon Centre
Southampton Road, Titchfield, Fareham, Hants
Transferred to No. 30 (Balloon Barrage) Group AAF - pre Jun 1944
No. 13 Balloon Centre
Collaton Cross, Yealmpton, Plymouth
No. 14 Balloon Centre
Caerau, Ely, Cardiff
Unknown - pre Jun 1944
No. 21 Balloon Centre
Pembroke Dock, Wales
27 Aug 1940 - 31 Dec 1941
No. 33 (Balloon Barrage) Group AAF
Long Benton / Sheffield (1940)
1 Mar 1939 - 4 Sep 1944
No. 15 Balloon Centre
Long Benton, Forest Hall, Newcastle-upon-Tyne
No. 16 Balloon Centre
Hemsworth, Norton, Sheffield
15 Aug 1939 - pre Jun 1944
No. 17 Balloon Centre
Royal Air Force Sutton-on-Hull, Hull
17 May 1939 - 15 Oct 1942
No. 34 (Balloon Barrage) Group AAF
Edinburgh
1 Jul 1940 - 4 Sep 1944
No. 18 Balloon Centre
Bishopbriggs, Glasgow
Aug 1939 - Unknown
No. 19 Balloon Centre
Rosyth, Fife
21 Oct 1939 - 6 May 1940
No. 18 Balloon Centre
Lyness, Orkney
2 Jun 1940 - 27 Dec 1941

Barrage Balloon Squadrons

No. 901 (County of London) Balloon Squadron AAF
16 May 1938
5 Flights of 9 balloons
Woolwich, Abbey Wood, Kidbrooke
No. 902 (County of London) Balloon Squadron AAF
16 May 1938
5 Flights of 9 balloons
Kidbrooke, Brixton
No. 903 (County of London) Balloon Squadron AAF
16 May 1938 - Unknown 1944
5 Flights of 9 balloons.
Amalgamated with 902 Sqn.
Brixton / Forest Hill
No. 904 (County of Surrey) Balloon Squadron AAF
16 May 1938
5 Flights of 9 balloons
Clapham
No. 905 (County of Surrey) Balloon Squadron AAF
16 May 1938 - Unknown 1944
5 Flights of 9 balloons.  Amalgamated with 901 Sqn
Kensington, Clapham
No. 906 (County of Middlesex) Balloon Squadron AAF
7 Jul 1938
5 Flights of 9 balloons
Hampstead, Kensington
No. 907 (County of Middlesex) Balloon Squadron AAF
16 May 1938
5 Flights of 9 balloons
Harringay / Woodberry Down
No. 908 (County of Essex) Balloon Squadron AAF
5 Jul 1938
5 Flights of 9 balloons
Wanstead, Harringay
No. 909 (County of Essex) Balloon Squadron AAF
16 May 1938
5 Flights of 9 balloons
West Ham, East Ham
No. 910 (County of Essex) Balloon Squadron AAF
5 Jul 1938
5 Flights of 9 balloons, (3 Water-borne (Aug 1940))
Dagenham, East Ham.
No. 911 (County of Warwick) Balloon Squadron AAF
Jan 1939 – Unknown
4 Flights of 8 balloons (48 balloons in Aug 1940)
West Bromwich, Chelmsford, Erdington (Dec 1943).
No. 912 (County of Warwick) Balloon Squadron AAF
Jan 1939 -Unknown
4 Flights of 8 balloons (24 balloons in Aug 1940)
Brockworth, Gloucester.
No. 913 (County of Warwick) Balloon Squadron AAF
Jan 1939 -Unknown
3 Flights of 8 balloons
Erdington / Sutton Coldfield, Chelmsford
No. 914 (County of Warwick) Balloon Squadron AAF
Jan 1939 - pre Jun 1944
4 Flights of 8 balloons (40 balloons in Aug 1940)
Wythall / Northfield.
No. 915 (County of Warwick) Balloon Squadron AAF
Jan 1939 -Unknown
4 Flights of 8 balloons (40 balloons in Aug 1940)
Bourneville / Rowkeath, Chelmsford.
No. 916 (County of Warwick) Balloon Squadron AAF
Jan 1939 – Unknown, Jun 1944 - Unknown
3 Flights of 8 balloons (32 balloons in Aug 1940)
Coventry
Reformed for Anti-'Diver' duties
No. 917 (County of Warwick) Balloon Squadron AAF
Jan 1939 - pre Jun 1944
3 Flights of 8 balloons
Coventry
No. 918 (County of Derby) Balloon Squadron AAF
Jan 1939 - pre Jun 1944
3 Flights of 8 balloons ( 32 balloons in Aug 1940)
Derby / Alveston.
No. 919 (West Lancashire) Balloon Squadron AAF
Jan 1939 - pre Jun 1944
4 Flights of 8 balloons. (52 balloons (12 Water-borne) in Aug 1940)
Birkenhead.
No. 920 Balloon Squadron AAF
Jan 1939 - pre Dec 1943
4 Flights of 8 balloons (A & B Flights later 12 balloons each, C & D retained 8 each)
Derry
No. 921 (West Lancashire) Balloon Squadron AAF
Jan 1939 - 20 Feb 1943
3 Flights of 8 balloons (48 balloons in Aug 1940)
Liverpool / Fazakerley.
No. 922 (West Lancashire) Balloon Squadron AAF
Jan 1939 - pre Dec 1943
4 Flights of 8 balloons
Warrington / Curerdley
No. 923 (West Lancashire) Balloon Squadron AAF
Jan 1939 -  Unknown, Jun 1944 -  Unknown
4 Flights of 8 balloons
Runcorn / Birkenhead
Reformed for Anti-'Diver' duties
No. 924 Balloon Squadron AAF
Jan 1939  Unknown
4 Flights of 8 balloons (24 balloons in Aug 1940)
Southampton / Eastleigh.
No. 925 (East Lancashire) Balloon Squadron AAF
Jan 1939 - pre Jun 1944
3 Flights of 8 balloons (40 balloons in Aug 1940)
Manchester
No. 926 (East Lancashire) Balloon Squadron AAF
Unknown - pre Jun 1944
3 Flights of 8 balloons (40 balloons in Aug 1940)
Bowlee / Manchester
No. 927 (County of Gloucester) Balloon Squadron AAF
Jan 1939  Unknown
3 Flights of 8 balloons (32 balloons in Aug 1940)
Bristol.
No. 928 Balloon Squadron AAF
Jan 1939  Unknown
3 Flights of 8 balloons (10 Water-borne Aug 1940)
Felixstowe / Harwich
No. 929 Balloon Squadron AAF
Jan 1939  Unknown
3 Flights of 8 balloons (7 Water-borneAug 1940)
South Queensferry
No. 930 (Hampshire) Balloon Squadron AAF
Jan 1939 - pre Dec 1943
3 Flights of 8 balloons (50 balloons (10 Water-borne ) in Aug 1940)
Southampton.
No. 931 (Hampshire) Balloon Squadron AAF
Jan 1939 - pre Dec 1943
3 Flights of 8 balloons
No. 932 (Hampshire) Balloon Squadron AAF
Jan 1939  Unknown
3 Flights of 8 balloons (32 balloons in Aug 1940)
Portsmouth
No. 933 (Hampshire) Balloon Squadron AAF
Jan 1939  Unknown
3 Flights of 8 balloons
Portsmouth / Gosport
No. 934 (County of Devon) Balloon Squadron AAF
Jan 1939  Unknown
5 Flights of 8 balloons (24 balloons in Aug 1940)
Plymouth.
No. 935 (County of Glamorgan) Balloon Squadron AAF
Jan 1939  Unknown
2 Flights of 8 balloons (24 balloons in Aug 1940)
Plymouth/Filton.
No. 936 (County of Northumberland) Balloon Squadron AAF
20 Feb 1939 - 4 Jun 1943
4 Flights of 8 balloons (4 Water-borne Aug 1940)
Newcastle upon Tyne
Amalgamated with No 937 on 4 Jun 1943
No. 937 (County of Northumberland) Balloon Squadron AAF
20 Feb 1939 - 4 Jun 1943
4 Flights of 8 balloons (40 balloons (3 Water-borne) in Aug 1940)
Newcastle upon Tyne
Amalgamated with No 936 on 4 Jun 1943
No. 936/937 Balloon Squadron AAF
4 Jun 1943 - 1 Dec 1944
No. 938 (County of Northumberland) Balloon Squadron AAF
20 Feb 1939 - 1 Dec 1944
3 Flights of 8 balloons (48 balloons in Aug 1940)
Stockton on Tees / Billingham
No. 939 (West Riding) Balloon Squadron AAF
Jan 1939  Unknown
3 Flights of 8 balloons
Sheffield
No. 940 (West Riding) Balloon Squadron AAF
Unknown - pre Jun 1944
Sheffield
3 Flights of 8 balloons
No. 941 (West Riding) Balloon Squadron AAF
Jan 1939  Unknown
3 Flights of 8 balloons (40 balloons in Aug 1940)
Sheffield / Sunderland (May 1943)
Amalgamated with 939 due to lack of volunteers
No. 942 (East Riding) Balloon Squadron AAF
25 Jan 1939 - 1 Jan 1942
3 Flights of 8 balloons 42 balloons (24 Water-borne) in Aug 1940
RAF Sutton on Hull
Amalgamated with 943 - 1 Jan 1942
No. 943 (East Riding) Balloon Squadron AAF
25 Jan 1939 - 1 Jan 1942
3 Flights of 8 balloons (32 balloons in Aug 1940)
RAF Sutton on Hull
Amalgamated with 942 - 1 Jan 1942
No. 942/943 (East Riding) Balloon Squadron AAF
1 Jan 1942 - 31 Aug 1944
Anti-'Diver- duties from 31 Jul 1944
No. 944 (East Riding) Balloon Squadron AAF
25 Jan 1939 -26 Apr 1942
3 Flights of 8 balloons
RAF Sutton on Hull
No. 945 (City of Glasgow) Balloon Squadron AAF
Jan 1939 -  Unknown, Jun 1944 -  Unknown
4 Flights of 8 balloons (40 balloons in Aug 1940)
Glasgow
Reformed in 22 Balloon Centre for Anti-'Diver' duties

No. 946 (City of Glasgow) Balloon Squadron AAF
Jan 1939 - pre Jun 1944
4 Flights of 8 balloons (48 balloons in Aug 1940)
Renfrew
No. 947 (City of Glasgow) Balloon Squadron AAF
Jan 1939 - pre Jun 1944, Jun 1944 -  Unknown
3 Flights of 8 balloons (32 balloons in Aug 1940)
Glasgow
Reformed in 22 Balloon Centre for Anti-'Diver' duties
No. 948 Balloon Squadron RAF
Oct 1939 - pre Dec 194
24 balloons in Aug 1940
Rosyth
No. 949 Balloon Squadron RAF  Oct 1949 -  Unknown, Jun 1944 -  Unknown
32 balloons in Aug 1940
Crewe
Reformed in 23 Balloon Centre for Anti-'Diver' duties
No. 950 Balloon Squadron RAF
Unknown – Unknown
Lyness, Orkney – Feb 1940,  Kirkwall, Orkney - 1944
32 balloons in Aug 1940
No. 951 Balloon Squadron RAF
Unknown - pre Dec 1943
40 balloons in Aug 1940
Bristol until 19 Jun 1944 (Norwich) and then Anti-'Diver' duties
No. 952 Balloon Squadron RAF
Nov 1939
Sheerness
40 balloons (32 Water-borne) in Aug 1940
No. 953 Balloon Squadron RAF
Cardiff 1943/44
39 balloons (7 Water-borne) in Aug 1940
1943/44 -, Anti-'Diver' duties from Jun 1944
No. 954 Balloon Squadron RAF

Cobham
No. 955 Balloon Squadron RAF
1943/44
Weston-super-Mare
No. 956 Balloon Squadron RAF
24 balloons in Aug 1940
No. 957 Balloon Squadron RAF
Jul 1940 – Unknown
Yeovil
24 balloons in Aug 1940
No. 958 Balloon Squadron RAF
Jul 1940 - Unknown
Swansea
25 balloons (3 Water-borne) in Aug 1940
Reformed in 23 Balloon Centre for Anti-'Diver' duties
No. 959 Balloon Squadron RAF
27 Aug 1940  Unknown
RAF
Feb 1940 - Unknown
Lyness, Orkney to Dec 1943, Canterbury 1944 on
24 balloons (16 Water-borne) in Aug 1940
No. 961 Balloon Squadron RAF
Jul 1940 – Unknown
Dover
8 Water-borne balloons (Aug 1940)
No. 962 Balloon Squadron RAF
Sep 1940 - pre Dec 1943
Milford Haven
24balloons (9 Water-borne) in Aug 1940
No. 963 Balloon Squadron RAF
Accrington - pre Dec 1943
No. 964 Balloon Squadron RAF
Aug 1940 - Unknown
Torpoint, Plymouth 1944 on
24 balloons (6 Water-borne) in Aug 1940
No. 965 Balloon Squadron RAF
Jul 1940 - Unknown
Port Talbot
16 balloons in Aug 1940
Reformed in 23 Balloon Centre for Anti-'Diver' duties
No. 966 Balloon Squadron RAF
Sep 1940 -  Unknown
Newport, Monmouthshire, moved to RAF Seal south of London from Jun 1944
40 balloons in Aug 1940
Reformed in 23 Balloon Centre for Anti-'Diver' duties
No. 967 Balloon Squadron RAF
Unknown - pre Dec 1943
Ardrossan
48 balloons in Aug 1940
No. 968 Balloon Squadron RAF
Unknown - pre Dec 1943
Belfast
16 balloons (8 Water-borne) in Aug 1940
No. 969 Balloon Squadron RAF
Jul 1940 – Unknown , -  Unknown
Barry pre Dec 1943, Great Yarmouth from Jun 1944
16 balloons in Aug 1940
Reformed in 23 Balloon Centre for Anti-'Diver' duties
No. 970 Balloon Squadron RAF
Barrow-in-Furness - pre Dec 1943
No. 971 Balloon Squadron RAF
1944
AHQ Eastern Mediterranean
No. 972 Balloon Squadron RAF
Egypt
No. 973 Balloon Squadron RAF
1944
AHQ Eastern Mediterranean
No. 974 Balloon Squadron RAF
Egypt
2nd Tactical Air Force (2nd TAF or 2 TAF)
No. 975 Balloon Squadron RAF
1944
No. 242 Group RAF
No. 976 Balloon Squadron RAF
1944
2nd TAF
No. 977 Balloon Squadron RAF
1944
Mediterranean Coastal Air Forces
No. 978 Balloon Squadron RAF
1941 1944
3rd TAF
No. 979 Balloon Squadron RAF
1944
3rd TAF
No. 980 Balloon Squadron RAF
Unknown - 6 Jun 1945
2nd TAF (1944 on)
980 Sqn defended Abadan from 1942 and Khosrowabad before being moved via Jordan to the Suez Canal and then Italy
No. 981 Balloon Squadron RAF
1941-Unknown
Mediterranean Coastal Air Forces
Reformed in UK for Anti-'Diver' duties - 1944
No. 982 Balloon Squadron RAF
1944
Mediterranean Coastal Air Forces
No. 983 Balloon Squadron RAF
1944
Mediterranean Coastal Air Forces
No. 984 Balloon Squadron RAF
1944
No. 222 Group RAF
No. 985 Balloon Squadron RAF
1944
No. 242 Group RAF
No. 986 Balloon Squadron RAF
1944
Malta
No. 987 Balloon Squadron RAF
1 Sep 1943-Unknown
No. 224 Group RAF (1944 on)
No. 988 Balloon Squadron RAF
No. 989 Balloon Squadron RAF
No. 990 Balloon Squadron RAF
1944
No. 222 Group AAF
No. 991 Balloon Squadron RAF
2nd TAF
No. 992 (Mobile) Balloon Squadron RAF
Dec 1943 -
No 30 (Balloon Barrage) Group RAF, Great Yarmouth
Jun 1944 to 85 Group, for the defence of ports.
No. 993 (Mobile) Balloon Squadron RAF
Dec 1943
No 30 (Balloon Barrage) Group RAF, Chelmsford
No. 994 (Mobile) Balloon Squadron RAF
Dec 1943
No 30 (Balloon Barrage) Group RAF, Canterbury
Jun 1944 to 85 Group,
No. 995 (Mobile) Balloon Squadron RAF
Dec 1943
No 30 (Balloon Barrage) Group RAF, Titchfield
No. 996 Balloon Squadron RAF
No. 85 Group RAF
Mobile Unit for the defence of ports
No. 997 Balloon Squadron RAF
Weymouth (1944)
Mobile Unit for the defence of ports
No. 998 Balloon Squadron RAF
Brighton (1944)
Mobile Unit for the defence of ports
No. 999 Balloon Squadron RAF
Paignton (1944)
Mobile Unit for the defence of ports

References

Military history of the United Kingdom during World War II
Military units and formations of the Royal Air Force in World War II